The Mratinje Dam is a concrete arch dam in the canyon of the Piva River in Montenegro.

The dam was completed in 1975 with designs by Energoprojekt. Its construction resulted in the flooding of the Piva canyon and the creation of Lake Piva, which, with its 12.5 km², is the second largest lake in Montenegro.

The foundations go as deep as  into the ground.  of concrete and 5,000 tonnes of steel were built into the dam.

The hydroelectric power station at Mratinje is capable of producing 860 gigawatt-hours per annum. It has three turbines and generators, each with a generation capacity of 120 MW.

The location of the 16th century Piva Monastery was flooded by the lake, so while the dam was built, the monastery was broken into pieces and moved to a higher ground, 3.5 km away. It was reconstructed in the original way.

References

Hydroelectric power stations in Montenegro
Dams in Montenegro
Dams completed in 1975
Arch dams